The women's 50 metre breaststroke event at the 2014 Commonwealth Games as part of the swimming programme took place on 24 and 25 July at the Tollcross International Swimming Centre in Glasgow, Scotland.

The medals were presented by Sophie, Countess of Wessex and the quaichs were presented by Michael Fennell, honorary life vice-president of the Commonwealth Games Federation and president of the Jamaica Olympic Association.

Records
Prior to this competition, the existing world and Commonwealth Games records were as follows.

The following records were established during the competition:

Results

Heats

Semifinals

Final

References

External links

Women's 050 metre breaststroke
Commonwealth Games
2014 in women's swimming